, doing business as  (which stands for "Mountain Ocean Sun"), is an international fast-food restaurant chain (fast-casual) from Japan. Its headquarters are in the ThinkPark Tower in Ōsaki, Shinagawa, Tokyo. At one time its headquarters were located in Shinjuku, Tokyo. The brand opened a location at the Tokyu Milano cinema and entertainment complex in Shinjuku in the mid-1990s replacing Wimpy, but closed in November 2011.
 	
It is the second-largest fast-food franchise in Japan after McDonald's Japan, and owns numerous overseas outlets over East Asia, Southeast Asia and Oceania, including China, Taiwan, Hong Kong, South Korea, Singapore, Thailand, Indonesia, the Philippines and  Australia. It is also the name of the standard hamburger offered by the restaurant, being its first product when it opened in 1972.

As of February 2014 the publicly traded company runs 1,730 MOS Burger and several AEN, Chef's V and Green Grill stores. One slogan used within its stores is "Japanese Fine Burger and Coffee".

Origins 

The company name, styled in all caps: MOS Burger, is a backronym for "Mountain, Ocean, Sun". However, originally the company was a spinoff of Atsushi Sakurada's previous company, Merchandising Organizing System. Later, the company began to use playful English phrases in point-of-purchase marketing materials to explain the name, including "MOSt delicious burger", before it finally settled on the current backronym.

Sakurada worked in Los Angeles at an investment company in the early 1960s, and during that time, he frequented the Los Angeles chili burger chain Original Tommy's. Wanting to strike out on his own after returning to Japan he decided to adapt the cook-to-order hamburger concept used by Original Tommy's. He also developed the MOS rice burger as an alternative to the hamburger.

In April 2011, MOS Burger opened its first store at Sunnybank Plaza, in Brisbane, Queensland, Australia. As of September 2021, the company has five stores in Australia, all of which are in Queensland.

MOS Burger has recently opened in the Philippines.

Products

MOS Rice Burger 
The MOS Rice Burger uses a bun made of rice mixed with barley and millet. Rice was first used as a bun in 1987, when the restaurant served the Tsukune Rice Burger, filled with ground chicken and daikon, and seasoned with soy sauce.

The MOS Rice Burger has been imitated by the Taiwanese division of McDonald's, where the rice bun was pan-seared, but it remains a MOS-exclusive item in Japan and other markets.

See also
 List of fast food restaurant chains
 List of hamburger restaurants

References

Further reading
 Daily Yomiuri interview with MOS Burger president Takao Shimizu

External links 
  

Fast-food chains of Japan
Food and drink companies based in Tokyo
Companies listed on the Tokyo Stock Exchange
Fast-food hamburger restaurants
Japanese restaurants
Restaurants in Japan
Restaurants established in 1972
1972 establishments in Japan
Fast-food chains of Singapore
Fast-food franchises